The Enid and Anadarko Railway Company' was incorporated on March 9, 1901 under the laws of the territory of Oklahoma by M.A. Low, J.C. Marshall, I.G. Conkling, H.D. Crossley and S.H. Thompson. The Chicago, Rock Island and Pacific Railway purchased the Enid and Anadarko Railway on October 21, 1903.

In 1901, the company built 60 miles of railroad from Enid, Oklahoma to Watonga, Oklahoma. In 1902, this was extended to Anadarko, Oklahoma, an additional 45 miles. The company also built 41 miles of railroad for the Lawton, Oklahoma to Waurika, Oklahoma line.

Enid and Anadarko Act
The Enid and Anadarko Act (32 Stat. 43) was approved by Congress on February 28, 1902. It granted the right of way through Oklahoma and Indian Territories for the Enid and Anadarko Railway Company.

References

Defunct Oklahoma railroads
Railway companies established in 1901
Railway companies disestablished in 1903
Railway companies in Enid, Oklahoma